Woodford Town F.C. may refer to three different football clubs based in Woodford, Greater London, England

Woodford Town F.C., the current club using the name
Woodford Town F.C. (1937), which folded in 2003
Woodford Town F.C. (2007), which folded in 2015